Molcie Lou Halsell Rodenberger (September 21, 1926 – April 9, 2009) was a Texas author, educator, professor, and journalist.

References

Sources

External links
Jane Gilmore Rushing: A West Texas Writer and Her Work
Texan Women Writers: A Tradition of Their Own
Writing on the Wind: An Anthology of West Texas Women Writers

1926 births
2009 deaths
People from Abilene, Texas
Academics from Texas
Historians of Texas
20th-century American women writers
Texas Woman's University alumni
Texas A&M University alumni
Deaths from cancer in Texas
Deaths from ovarian cancer
People from Eastland County, Texas
People from Callahan County, Texas
Women historians
American women journalists
Journalists from Texas
20th-century Methodists
21st-century Methodists
American United Methodists
20th-century American non-fiction writers
20th-century American journalists